Buk District (literally north district) is a gu, or district, in north central Busan, South Korea. Buk-gu covers a surface of 38.30 km² is home to about 335,000 people. It attained the status of gu in 1978.

Administrative divisions

Buk-gu is divided into 5 legal dong, which all together comprise 13 administrative dong, as follows:

 Gupo-dong (3 administrative dong)
 Geumgok-dong
 Hwamyeong-dong (3 administrative dong)
 Deckcheon-dong (3 administrative dong)
 Mandeok-dong (3 administrative dong)

Sister cities
  Jiaozhou, China

Notable people from Buk District
 Seungwoo (Real Name: Han Seung-woo, Hangul: 한승우), singer-songwriter, rapper, dancer and K-pop idol, member of K-pop boygroup Victon and former member of K-pop boygroup X1
 Jungkook (Real Name: Jeon Jeong-guk, Hangul: 전정국), K-pop idol, singer-songwriter, producer, main vocalist and lead dancer of BTS

See also
 Geography of South Korea
 Subdivisions of South Korea

References

External links 
 Buk-gu website (in English)

 
Districts of Busan